When the Cock Crows (German: Wenn der Hahn kräht) is a 1936 German comedy film directed by Carl Froelich and starring Heinrich George, Hans Brausewetter and Marianne Hoppe. It was shot at the National Studios in Berlin. The film's sets were designed by the art directors Walter Haag and Franz Schroedter. It is based on a folk play of the same title by August Hinrichs.

Synopsis
In a rural village in Northern Germany Lena the daughter of the grouchy mayor is in love with Peter a young veterinarian. However her parents are against the match as she has already been promised to another man who is due to inherit a farm. He is in turn courted by Marie, a woman who has recently arrived in the area.

Cast
 Heinrich George as Jan Kreyenborg, Gemeindevorsteher
 Hans Brausewetter as 	Peter Renken, Tierarzt
 Marianne Hoppe as Marie
 Claire Reigbert as 	Gesine Kreyenborg
 Hildegard Barko as 	Lena Kreyenborg
 Carsta Löck as 	Stine
 Fritz Hoopts as Willem Tameling, Knecht
 Wilhelm P. Krüger as 	Jochen Witt, Schneider
 Karl John as 	Piepers Gustav
 Ernst Waldow as 	Kröger, Amtshauptmann
 Hugo Froelich as 	Stindt, Wachtmeister
 Paul Luka as 	Peter Witt, Viehhändler
 Paul Rehkopf as 	Dorfarzt
 Maria Seidler as Frau des Dorfarztes
 Eugenie Dengler as 	Mädchen an der Kirmesbude

References

Bibliography 
 Bock, Hans-Michael & Bergfelder, Tim. The Concise CineGraph. Encyclopedia of German Cinema. Berghahn Books, 2009.
 Klaus, Ulrich J. Deutsche Tonfilme: Jahrgang 1936. Klaus-Archiv, 1988.

External links 
 

1936 films
Films of Nazi Germany
1930s German-language films
Films directed by Carl Froelich
1930s German films
German comedy films
1936 comedy films
Tobis Film films
German films based on plays